The  is a professional wrestling tag team championship in the Japanese promotion Gleat. The title is the first tag team title to be created by the promotion and the second overall.

There have been a total of two reigns shared between two different teams consisting of four distinctive champions. The current lineal title holders are Bulk Orchestra (Check Shimatani and Hayato Tamura). As Tamura is recovering from an injury incurred on October 9, 2022, #StrongHearts (Shigehiro Irie and T-Hawk) are serving as the interim champions.

History
Gleat was founded in 2020, after Lidet Entertainment sold all its shares of Pro Wrestling Noah to CyberAgent. Lidet's President Hiroyuki Suzuki, wanting to continue his involvement with professional wrestling, announced the formation of Gleat in August 2020, alongside Kiyoshi Tamura, Kaz Hayashi and Nosawa Rongai. The promotion features two brands: G Prowrestling, a traditional puroresu brand, and Lidet UWF, a shoot style brand inspired by UWF International.

In July 2022, Gleat announced the creation of the G-Infinity Championship for its G Prowrestling brand. A four-team tournament was held from August 20, 2022, to August 24 to crown the inaugural champions. The tournament was won by Bulk Orchestra (Kazma Sakamoto and Ryuichi Kawakami). After the match, Nobuhiro Shimatani and Hayato Tamura, who are also members of the Bulk Orchestra stable, announced their challenge to the title.

Inaugural tournament

Reigns

Combined reigns 

By team

By wrestler

See also
Professional wrestling in Japan

References

Tag team wrestling championships